Keling or Kling is a derogatory term used in parts of Southeast Asia to denote a person originating from the Indian subcontinent. This includes both those from India and overseas Indians. In modern usage it is not commonly capitalised. The term is used in the Malay Archipelago — specifically Malaysia, Indonesia, Singapore and Brunei — but cognates exist in neighbouring countries as well. Although the early definition was neutral and linked to the historical Kalinga kingdom of Eastern India, it is generally considered offensive by Indians in Southeast Asia.

In Brunei, the word Kaling was not considered to be pejorative, but due to media influence from Malaysia, the majority of Bruneians now tend to avoid using it.

Etymology
The word Keling derives from the ancient Indian kingdom of Kalinga.According to political scientist Sudama Misra, the Kalinga janapada originally comprised the area covered by the Puri and Ganjam districts.

Reference-Sudama Misra (1973). Janapada state in ancient India. Bhāratīya Vidyā Prakāśana. p. 78

While this was apparently sometimes localized as Kalingga (as in the Indonesian Kalingga Kingdom), the terminal schwa sound was dropped in common usage to form Keling. Though ostensibly denoting the Kalinga kingdom, the term Keling in ancient Southeast Asia came to be a more general term for India and its people. The Khmer word Kleng (ក្លិង្គ) derived from the same root. Prior to the introduction of the English word "India", Keling and Jambu Dwipa were used to refer to the country in the Malay and Indonesian language, while Benua Keling referred to the Indian Subcontinent.

Usage 
The earliest known occurrence of the word Keling appears in the Sejarah Melayu (Malay Annals). The legend mentions Raja Shulan as the king of Kalingga who sets out to conquer China with his descendant Raja Chulan. Scholars identify Raja Chulan with the Chola king of southern India, from whom the term Chulia derives, as in Penang's Chulia Street. Later parts of the Sejarah Melayu mention the voyages of Hang Nadim and Hang Tuah to Benua Keling (India). However Keling must not be misunderstood as a specific territory, rather it refers to people of Indian origin and not only the inhabitants of Kalinga. For example, a colonial-era Indonesian tradition refers to the Ramayana epic as Rama Keling meaning "Rama the Indian".  After the introduction of Islam, Keling sometimes referred specifically to Tamils or Telugu people while Gujaratis and Indo-Aryan peoples from Pakistan were often confused with Parsi or Persians.

The Dutch used the words "Clings" and "Klingers" to refer to the Indian inhabitants of Malacca. The British colonial writings also use the word "Kling" to describe the immigrants from Madras Presidency and Coromandel coast. John Crawfurd (1856) mentioned that the term "Kling" was used by the Malays and the Javanese as "a general term for all the people of Hindustan (North India), and for the country India itself".

The 16th-century Portuguese traveller Castanheda wrote of the Keling community in Melaka in the period between 1528 and 1538:

In the northern part [of the city of Malacca] live merchants known as Quelins [Klings — a name applied to South Indians]; in this part the town is much larger than at any other. There are at Malacca, many foreign merchants ...

In its early usage Keling was a neutral term for people of Indian origin, but was perceived negatively beginning in the 20th century due to various socio-political factors. From the mid-1900s, words denoting ethnic origin were used derogatively in Malay to imply immigrant status.  Consequently, more neutral language was adopted. This can be observed in the book Cherita Jenaka, where the term orang Keling (Keling people) in the 1960 edition was changed to orang India (Indian people) in the 1963 edition.

Malay
The word Keling has been used variously within the Malay community to mean Indian, Tamil, or south Indian. The title "Kapitan Keling" was used for a representative of an Indian community, similar to the "Kapitan Cina" of a Chinese community. In early Penang of the 1790s the Kapitan Keling was Cauder Mohideen who, together with the Kapitan Cina Koh Lay Huan and other prominent members of the community, formed the first Committee of Assessors to decide the rates and collection of taxes. This usage is preserved is the name of the Kapitan Keling Mosque, a prominent Penang landmark.

In some modern cases Keling is used as a derogatory term. It was used in 2005 by Members of Parliament in Malaysia because of misconception about Indian ethnics, which resulted in an uproar accusing the MPs of racism.

The definition of the word may vary from one Malaysian state to another. In Kedah, for example, the term is mainly used to refer to Muslims of Indian descent (In Selangor, the word Mamak is used to refer to an Indian Muslim).

Javanese
Traditionally in Java, Indonesia, Keling is linked with India while Kalingga refers to the 6th century Kalingga Kingdom, which ultimately derived from the Indian Kalinga kingdom. It can possibly have other meanings, such as "ship". Rivets used to connect metals are called paku keling (lit. "blunt nail"); however, it came from Dutch klinknagel. In modern colloquial Indonesian, it is sometimes used to refer to any dark-skinned person, a stereotype of southern Indians, though this usage is considered offensive.

Philippine
For the southern Philippines, it has been suggested that the sobriquet "Kiling", which referred to the name of a local Rajah (Rajah Kiling of Butuan), is not Visayan in origin but rather, Indian, because Kiling refers to the people of India among the Mindanaoans.

Cambodian
In Cambodia, the slang term for Indian people is Kleng (ក្លិង្គ), also derived from the kingdom of Kalinga and cognate with the Malay Keling or Kling. It may also be used as a nickname for people who have stereotypically Indian features such as big eyes and dark skin.

Thai
The equivalent of Keling in the Thai language is Khaek (แขก). It is a generic term referring to anyone from South Asia. The term generally has no negative connotation and is used even in polite or formal communication. However, outside influence and confusion with Mughals and Indian Muslims has broadened the meaning in modern times to include certain predominantly Muslims communities, particularly Persians and Arabs. This extended meaning is considered inaccurate and at times rejected as derogatory, especially by Thai Muslims, but has become increasingly widespread.

Chinese
The phrases Keling-a (Hokkien; 吉寧仔; POJ: Ki-lêng-á), Keling-yan (Cantonese; 吉寧人; Yale: gat-lìhng-yan),(Hakka; 吉灵仔 git-lin-zai); and Keling-kia (Teochew) are frequently used within the Chinese community in Malaysia, Brunei, and Singapore.
The Hokkien and Teochew suffixes -a and -kia are diminutives that are generally used to refer to non-Chinese ethnic groups, while the Cantonese "-yan" means "people".

Names of places
Various place names in Malaysia contain the word Keling for historical reasons, e.g. Tanjong Keling., Kampong Keling, and Bukit Keling, etc.

In Penang, the Kapitan Keling Mosque, situated on the corner of Buckingham Street and Jalan Masjid Kapitan Keling (Pitt Street), is one of the oldest mosques in George Town. Various other Penang Hokkien street names contain the word Keling, e.g. Kiet-leng-a Ban-san (Chowrasta Road), Kiet-leng-a Ke (King Street/Market Street). In Malacca, another mosque also uses the word Kling, Kampung Kling Mosque.

In Singapore, there is a road in Jurong Industrial Estate called Tanjong Kling Road which is probably derived from the word 'Keling'.

In Jepara Regency, Central Java, Indonesia, there is a district called Keling. Locals link the location with the 6th century Kalingga Kingdom. In Surabaya, East Java, Indonesia, there is a place called Pacar Keling meaning "Keling lover".

See also
 Maritime history
Kaling invasion of Southeast Asia
Kalinga historical region of India
Kalingga Hindu Kingdom of Indonesia 
Kalinga province of Philippines
Kalinga alphabet of India

References

External links 
 List of regions of India
 Dr. S. Jayabarathi from Malaysia's article on KELING
 Racism and the Word "Keling"

Anti-Hindu sentiment
Anti-Indian sentiment in Asia
Ethnic and religious slurs
Indonesian culture
Malaysian culture
Racism in Asia
Tamil diaspora in Asia